José María Soler García was a Spanish archaeologist, historian, researcher and folklorist. He is one of the persons who most deeply studied Villena and its surrounding area, since the vast majority of his research was focused on what concerned his hometown.

In 1957 he founded Villena's Archaeological Museum with the findings he had collected from the 1920s on. In 1963, after he found the Treasure of the Cabezo Redondo in March and the Treasure of Villena in December, the museum's name was officially changed to Archaeological Museum "José María Soler". The José María Soler Foundation, constituted after his death, calls every year Research Awards in order to keep alive Soler's legacy.

Publications 
Soler has written several books on his archaeological works, some others on historical or folkloric research and even one dictionary on Villena's Spanish dialect. He has written a large number of articles published in newspapers and magazines, and he has also given many lectures all over Spain. A list of his published books follows:

Archaeology
1956. El yacimiento musteriense de "La Cueva del Cochino" (Villena-Alicante)
1965. El tesoro de Villena
1969. El oro de los tesoros de Villena
1981. El Eneolítico en Villena
1987. Excavaciones arqueológicas en el Cabezo Redondo (Villena, Alicante)
1991. La Cueva del Lagrimal
1993. Guía de los yacimientos y del Museo de Villena
History
1948. Crónica de las Fiestas de septiembre de 1948
1969. La Relación de Villena de 1575
1976. Villena: Prehistoria - Historia - Monumentos
1981-1988. Historia de Villena
1993. La colección numismática de José Mª Soler
2006. Historia de Villena: desde la Prehistoria hasta el siglo XVIII (re-ed. 2009)
Linguistics
1993. Dicionario villenero (reed. 2005)
Music and folklore
1979. El Polifonista villenense Ambrosio Cotes
1986. Cancionero popular de Villena (re-ed. 2005)
Other themes
1958. Bibliografía de Villena y su Partido Judicial
1976. I Congreso Nacional de Fiestas de Moros y Cristianos
1984. Soldadescas, Comparsas y Toros

Awards 
Musicology Award of CSIC, on the Cancionero popular de Villena (1949)
Golden Medal of Villena (1973)
Bronze Medal in Fine Arts (1980)
Montaigne Award of Hamburg's FvS Foundation (1981)
Doctor honoris causa by Universidad de Alicante (1985)
Gold Medal of the Province of Alicante (1991)
In addition, Villena's City Hall gave his name to one street in the old part of the city in 1979.

References

External links
Archaeological Museum José María Soler

1905 births
1996 deaths
People from Alto Vinalopó
20th-century Spanish archaeologists
Linguists from Spain
Folklorists
Writers from the Valencian Community
Villena
20th-century linguists